The Voorhees Township Public Schools is a comprehensive community public school district serving students in pre-kindergarten through eighth grade from Voorhees Township, in Camden County, New Jersey, United States.

As of the 2019–20 school year, the district, comprised of five schools, had an enrollment of 2,976 students and 228.6 classroom teachers (on an FTE basis), for a student–teacher ratio of 13.0:1.

The district is classified by the New Jersey Department of Education as being in District Factor Group "I", the second-highest of eight groupings. District Factor Groups organize districts statewide to allow comparison by common socioeconomic characteristics of the local districts. From lowest socioeconomic status to highest, the categories are A, B, CD, DE, FG, GH, I and J.

Public school students in ninth through twelfth grades attend the Eastern Camden County Regional High School District, a limited-purpose, public regional school district that serves students at Eastern Regional High School from the constituent communities of Berlin Borough, Gibbsboro and Voorhees Township. As of the 2019–20 school year, the high school had an enrollment of 1,928 students and 140.4 classroom teachers (on an FTE basis), for a student–teacher ratio of 13.7:1.

Awards and recognition
For the 2003-04 school year, Edward T. Hamilton Elementary School was recognized as a National Blue Ribbon School by the United States Department of Education, one of 233 selected nationwide.

Schools
Schools in the district (with 2019–20 enrollment data from the National Center for Education Statistics) are:
Elementary schools
Edward T. Hamilton Elementary School with 384 students in grades K-5
Andrew Moskowitz, Principal
Kresson Elementary School with 382 students in grades K-5
Stacey Morris, Principal
Osage Elementary School with 684 students in grades K-5
Robert A. Cranmer, Principal
Signal Hill Elementary School with 485 students in grades PreK-5
Sharon Stallings, Principal
Middle school
Voorhees Middle School with 1,018 students in grades 6-8
Kris Calabria, Principal

Administration
Core members of the district's administration are:

Dr. Neely Hackett, Superintendent
Helen Haley, Business Administrator / Board Secretary

Board of education
The district's board of education is comprised of nine members who set policy and oversee the fiscal and educational operation of the district through its administration. As a Type II school district, the board's trustees are elected directly by voters to serve three-year terms of office on a staggered basis, with three seats up for election each year held (since 2012) as part of the November general election. The board appoints a superintendent to oversee the district's day-to-day operations and a business administrator to supervise the business functions of the district.

References

External links
Voorhees Township Public Schools

School Data for the Voorhees Township Public Schools, National Center for Education Statistics
Eastern Camden County Regional School District

Voorhees Township, New Jersey
New Jersey District Factor Group I
School districts in Camden County, New Jersey